Dilraba Dilmurat (born on June 3, 1992), known in Chinese as Dilireba, is a Chinese actress, host, dancer, singer and model of Uyghur ethnicity.

Life
Dilraba was born on June 3, 1992 in Urumqi, Xinjiang, China to an Uyghur family. Aside from Mandarin, she is fluent in Uyghur and English. 

In 2001, when she was nine years old, her father brought her to Xinjiang Art Middle School to take the entrance exam. At the time, she thought it was an interesting class. Later, when she got an offer from the school, she realized she would be going to a dance school for the next six years.

In 2007, she graduated from the Xinjiang Arts Institute and became a member of the Xinjiang Song and Dance Troupe.

In 2009, she studied at Northeast Normal University in Jilin for one year. During this time, she received third place at a local singing contest.

In 2010, she enrolled in the performance department of Shanghai Theater Academy, majoring in drama, film and television. In the same year, she auditioned for director Lu Chuan’s new project The Last Supper.

Career

2013–2016: acting debut and rising popularity 
In 2013, Dilraba made her acting debut in the television drama Anarhan, playing the lead role. The drama was nominated for Outstanding Television Series at the 30th Flying Apsaras Awards.

In 2014, she signed with Jay Walk Studio and starred in the web series V Love, produced by the company. The same year, Dilraba gained recognition for her role as Fuqu in the hit fantasy drama Swords of Legends.

In 2015, Dilraba starred in the romantic comedy Diamond Lover, winning acclaim for her role as a sassy pop-star. She won the Audience's Favorite Newcomer award at the 7th China TV Drama Awards for her performance.

In 2016, Dilraba was cast in the leading role for the youth sports drama Hot Girl. She won the Outstanding New Actress award at 2016 ENAwards for her performance in the series.

2017–present: breakthrough
In 2017, Dilraba played the leading role in the romantic comedy Pretty Li Huizhen, a remake of South Korean drama She Was Pretty. The series was popular during its run and has over 7 billion views online and she won Most Popular Actress award and Audience's Choice for Actress award at the China TV Golden Eagle Award for her performance. She also starred in the fantasy romance series Eternal Love as a fox fairy. The drama gained explosive popularity in China as well as internationally, and led to increased recognition and popularity for Dilraba. For the role, she received a Best Supporting Actress nomination at the Shanghai Television Festival.

That same year, she had her first big screen leading role in romantic comedy film Mr. Pride vs Miss Prejudice. Her performance earned her the Best New Actress award at the 2016 China Britain Film Festival. She then starred in the historical romance drama The King's Woman, and fantasy film Namiya, the Chinese adaptation of Japanese novel Miracles of the Namiya General Store. Dilraba won the Newcomer award at the Golden Phoenix Awards for her performance in Namiya.

In 2017, Dilraba also joined the fifth season of Keep Running as a cast member, earning increased popularity for her variety stint. Forbes China listed Dilraba on their 30 Under 30 Asia 2017 list which consisted of 30 influential people under 30 years old who have had a substantial effect in their fields.
 
In 2018, Dilraba starred in the romantic comedy film 21 Karat. She then starred in the wuxia romance drama The Flame's Daughter alongside Vic Chou. In the same year, the science fiction romance comedy drama Sweet Dreams alongside Deng Lun was premiered. The series’ concurrent TV viewership ratings ‘broke 1%’, with an average of 1.018% in 52 cities and had reached 6 billion online views before the drama wrapped its run. Due to her rising popularity, Dilraba was crowned the Golden Eagle Goddess at the 12th China Golden Eagle TV Art Festival.

In 2018, after surpassing 40 million followers on Weibo it was announced that Dilraba has an independent studio under Jay Walk Studio.

In 2019, Dilraba appeared on the CCTV New Year's Gala for the first time, performing the song item "China Happy Events". Dilraba also joined the fifth season of Go Fighting! as a regular cast member.

In 2019, she was one of the mentors in the competition show Produce Camp 2019.

In January 2020, Dilraba starred in the fantasy romance Eternal Love of Dream, reprising her role as Fengjiu from Eternal Love. The same year, she starred in the workplace romance drama Love Advanced Customization, portraying a fashion designer.

In June 2020, Dilraba was ranked by Statista as the second-most-popular celebrity on Douyin, with 55.6 million followers. Dilraba later starred in the historical fantasy film Saga of Light portraying Chang'e.

In 2021, she starred in the historical drama The Long Ballad, portraying Li Changge. This series brought her a further rise in popularity. Dilraba later starred in You Are My Glory as Qiao Jingjing alongside Yang Yang. The series was a commercial success and gained 4 billion views throughout its run.

In 2022, she was cast in The Blue Whisper alongside Ren Jialun and in the Legend of Anle alongside Gong Jun.

Endorsements
Dilraba is considered one of the most in-demand brand ambassadors in China due to numerous endorsement deals ranging from food and beverage, basic commodities, beauty and retail products, to mobile applications and technological products. She also endorses several international brands like L'oreal and Mikimoto. P&G's Whisper saw a rise in sales after engaging Dilraba as their spokesperson. In 2018, Dilraba ended her contract with Dolce & Gabbana after a racist ad incident in China.

In 2021, as a Uyghur from Xinjiang, Dilraba publicly voiced her support for cotton produced in Xinjiang after several international companies announced they will not purchase cotton from the region due to concerns of forced labor of Uyghurs. Her actions were echoed by most other Chinese celebrities cutting ties with those brands.

In the same year Dilraba was announced as Panerai's first ever female Global Brand Ambassador.

Dilraba Dilmurat's 19 active brand endorsements per Feb 2023

Social activities 
On August 29, 2012, Dilraba went to a charity house in Xinjiang, and visited the local orphans.

In 2015, Dilraba joined the Network tree planting and greening project initiated by China Green Foundation's Action for Protecting Nature. In the same year, she was invited to participate in the "dressing together to help love" public welfare activity held by BAZAAR Star Charity Night, and all the charity sale funds obtained from the event were donated.

In 2016, Dilraba participated in the MAKEAPROMISE campaign to help the children who suffer from wars, diseases, and natural disasters. The campaign is held by UNICEF and Louis Vuitton, aimed to support more children in need around the world.

In 2017, Dilraba participated in the online charity auction initiated by BAZAAR Star Charity Night, and she donated a silver waist chain to fundraise more money for having more ambulances in remote cities in China.

In 2018, Dilraba participated in the public welfare project to support the "Medical Insurance for Diseases", helping to alleviate China’s health and poverty issues. She saved 25 million children in 585 poverty counties from being impoverished due to illness. In March, Dilraba call on more people to pay attention to the education of adolescent girls in China. In November, Dilraba was invited by Alibaba company to become a public welfare star in poverty alleviation in China, and invited everyone in the country to join her in helping the revitalization of her home region of Xinjiang.

In 2019, Dilraba was invited to join a media action named “China YOUNG”, and she was nominated as one of the leaders of the campaign. In September, together with reporters from "Global" magazine, Dilraba followed the Forestry and Grassland Bureau of Tibet to go deep into the "Qiangtang Plateau" to explore the local protection actions of wild animals.

In 2021, Dilraba donated 500,000 RMB to Henan to help the province recover from a storm.

Filmography

Film

Television series

Short film

Variety show

Discography

Singles

Awards and nominations

Forbes China Celebrity 100

Stalker incident 
On June 7, 2020, while Dilraba was on a variety show to promote products from impoverished farmers in Hunan, a male audience member went on stage, tapped her on the shoulder, got down on one knee and proposed to her with a ring. Wang Han, the show's host, stepped in between them and asked the crew to escort him off the stage. The man had reportedly been stalking her for half a year. Chinese netizens criticised the lax security measures and on June 10, expressed their outrage when authorities at Changsha only gave him 7 days' detention as punishment. Further condemnation followed after the man showed a lack of remorse when released.

See also 

 Neghmet Rakhman
 Perhat Khaliq

References

External links 

 Dilraba Dilmurat on Sina Weibo

1992 births
Living people
Actresses from Xinjiang
Uyghur people
Chinese film actresses
Chinese television actresses
Chinese female models
21st-century Chinese actresses
People from Ürümqi
Jay Walk Studio
Shanghai Theatre Academy alumni
Northeast Normal University alumni